Kelma Tuilagi (born 16 February 1999) is a Samoan professional rugby league footballer who plays as a  forward for the Manly-Warringah Sea Eagles in the NRL and Samoa at international level.

He previously for the Wests Tigers in the National Rugby League.

Early life
Tuilagi was born in Apia, Samoa, he then moved to New Zealand. He attended Waitakere College in Auckland from 2013.

Tuilagi played junior rugby league with Glenora Bears, representing the Junior Kiwis in 2018.

After moving to Melbourne, Victoria, Australia he was educated at Hallam Secondary College, Tuilagi played with Casey Warriors in the Melbourne Rugby League. 
Playing junior representative rugby league with the Victorian Thunderbolts, Tuilagi was signed on a development contract with Melbourne Storm, spending most of his time with feeder club Easts Tigers in the Queensland Cup.

Playing career

2021
In round 20 of the 2021 NRL season, Tuilagi made his debut for the Wests Tigers against the New Zealand Warriors.

In round 22, he scored his first try in the NRL during a 24–16 victory over North Queensland.

2022
In October Tuilagi was named in the Samoa squad for the 2021 Rugby League World Cup.

References

External links

Wests Tigers profile
Samoa profile

1999 births
Samoan rugby league players
Rugby league second-rows
Wests Tigers players
Manly Warringah Sea Eagles players
Living people